Wiejkowo  is a village in the administrative district of Gmina Wolin, within Kamień County, West Pomeranian Voivodeship, in north-western Poland.

The village has a population of 300.

History
The von Guentersberg family governed Weckow since 1299 until they died out in 1763 and the von Berg family received the town. Alexandrine von Berg inherited Weckow from her father and with her marriage to Albert von Ploetz, the town was in the possession of the von Ploetz family until 1945. Under the terms of the Potsdam Agreement, the region became part of Poland after World War II, and Poles expelled from Soviet-occupied eastern Poland were resettled in the region.

The Curmsun disc

The Curmsun disc was reportedly part of a Viking Age hoard discovered in 1841 in the crypt of the ruined wooden church at Wiejkowo, when the new church was being constructed. Yet it apparently remained there until after WWII. Then it became the property of the local Sielski family, but its importance remained unknown. It was kept in the family as an oddity. After the family later moved to Sweden, in 2014, 11-year-old Maja Sielska showed the disc to her history teacher; its significance was then understood. The discovery of the disc was reported in the press on 5 December 2014.

References

Wiejkowo